Queen Anne's County is located on the Eastern Shore of the U.S. state of Maryland. As of the 2020 census, the population was 49,874. Its county seat and most populous municipality is Centreville. The census-designated place of Stevensville is the county's most populous place. The county is named for Queen Anne of Great Britain, who reigned when the county was established in 1706 during the colonial period.

Queen Anne's County is included in the Baltimore-Columbia-Towson, MD Metropolitan Statistical Area, which is also included in the Washington-Baltimore-Arlington, DC-MD-VA-WV-PA Combined Statistical Area, and is the easternmost in both. The Chesapeake Bay Bridge connects Kent Island in Queen Anne's County to Anne Arundel County across the Chesapeake Bay.

The American Discovery Trail runs through the county.

History
Queen Anne's County has two hundred sixty-five miles of waterfront, much of that being the shores of Kent Island, which stands out from the eastern shore of the Chesapeake Bay. From the waters of this county, watermen have harvested oysters, crabs, and terrapin.  Migrating waterfowl overwinter here, and hunting for geese and ducks has been an important part of the county's history.  The first Anglo-European settlement in Maryland was on Kent Island on August 21, 1631, and included twenty-five settlers in a manor house, a fort, and other buildings.  The settlement was referred to as Winston's Island.  The first houses were built similar to log cabins.  The county has a number of properties on the National Register of Historic Places, but nothing remains of this original settlement. Stevensville, earlier known as Broad Creek, is one of the oldest towns still existing.

Queen Anne's County was organized under a sheriff in 1706, bounded by Talbot, Kent, and Dorchester counties. In 1713, Queen Anne's County became an English postal district; the sheriff was also appointed as the postmaster and would travel to Annapolis, Maryland by boat across the Chesapeake Bay to obtain mail. In 1773 a part of Queen Anne's County, together with a portion of Dorchester County, was taken to form Caroline County.  The county now is enclosed by Talbot, Caroline, and Kent counties, as well as the Chesapeake Bay.

By the time of Independence, the county had several churches, a government, school, and a postal system. It was developed for agriculture, and enslaved African Americans worked the fields of plantations. Tobacco was an early commodity crop but it exhausted the soil. By the Revolution, some planters were converting to mixed agriculture, which was less labor intensive. They sold excess slaves in the domestic trade to the developing cotton plantations of the Deep South.

In 1876, Queen Anne's County had the first printed independent paper called the Maryland Citizen. A bank was located in Centreville; the Centreville National Bank is still operating. A railway was constructed here in 1868; it operated from Baltimore, passing around the top of the Chesapeake Bay down to Queenstown, and connected with other railroads that continued east into Delaware as far as Rehoboth, and southward to the Eastern Shore of Virginia.

In the 20th century, Queen Anne's County was the home of Jimmie Foxx, who was elected to the Baseball Hall of Fame.  A statue and small park commemorate him in Sudlersville, where Foxx grew up.

Politics and government
Queen Anne's was historically the most strongly secessionist county in Maryland, dominated by the Democratic Party of the planters. Following the American Civil War, the predominately conservative white voters voted for the Democratic Presidential nominee in every election from 1868 to 1948, though Herbert Hoover came within a point of defeating Al Smith in 1928 amidst great Southern resentment to Smith's Catholicism and opposition to Prohibition. Former general Dwight D. Eisenhower became the first Republican to carry the county in 1952.

Since the late 20th century, Queen Anne's white voters have largely shifted to the Republican Party, in a realignment that has taken place among conservative whites across the South following the tumultuous 1960s and passage of national civil rights legislation. No Democratic presidential candidate has carried Queen Anne's County since Texan Lyndon Johnson’s 1964 landslide. Democrat Jimmy Carter in 1980 remains the last Democrat to obtain even forty percent of the county’s vote, and he in 1976 was the last to come within ten points of winning the county.

|}

Queen Anne's County was granted home rule in 1990 under a state code.

The county has a commission form of government.  The commission consists of five commissioners: one at-large and four of whom must reside in the district they represent. All of the commissioners are elected by the general population. The at-large commissioner serves as president the first year following election. County code allows for rotation of the president position thereafter.

The current Board of Commissioners was elected in the 2018 election, and serves a four-year term.  The current County Commissioners are Stephen Wilson (District 2), Christopher M. Corchiarino (District 4), Philip L. Dumenil (District 3), James J. Moran (At-Large), and Jack N. Wilson, Jr. (District 1). The current form of five commissioners elected at large started in 2002. Prior to the 2002 election, Queen Anne's County was run by three commissioners.

Geography

Adjacent counties
 Kent County (north)
 Kent County, Delaware (east)
 Talbot County (south)
 Caroline County (southeast)
 Anne Arundel County (west)

Major highways
U.S. Route 50 and U.S. Route 301 are the major highways serving Queen Anne's County.

Demographics

2000 census
As of the census of 2000, there were 40,563 people, 15,315 households, and 11,547 families living in the county.  The population density was 109 people per square mile (42/km2).  There were 16,674 housing units at an average density of 45 per square mile (17/km2).  The racial makeup of the county was 89.05% White, 8.78% Black or African American, 0.22% Native American, 0.57% Asian, 0.02% Pacific Islander, 0.43% from other races, and 0.93% from two or more races.  1.09% of the population were Hispanic or Latino of any race. 16.9% were of German, 15.1% American, 14.6% English, 14.2% Irish and 5.3% Italian ancestry.

There were 15,315 households, out of which 33.30% had children under the age of 18 living with them, 62.20% were married couples living together, 9.50% had a female householder with no husband present, and 24.60% were non-families. 19.60% of all households were made up of individuals, and 7.90% had someone living alone who was 65 years of age or older.  The average household size was 2.62 and the average family size was 2.99.

In the county, the population was spread out, with 25.40% under the age of 18, 5.80% from 18 to 24, 30.10% from 25 to 44, 25.90% from 45 to 64, and 12.90% who were 65 years of age or older.  The median age was 39 years. For every 100 females, there were 99.20 males.  For every 100 females age 18 and over, there were 96.80 males.

The median income for a household in the county was $57,037, and the median income for a family was $63,713. Males had a median income of $44,644 versus $30,144 for females. The per capita income for the county was $26,364.  About 4.40% of families and 6.30% of the population were below the poverty line, including 7.20% of those under age 18 and 7.30% of those age 65 or over.

2010 census
As of the 2010 United States Census, there were 47,798 people, 18,016 households, and 13,314 families living in the county. The racial makeup of the county was 88.7% white, 6.9% black or African American, 1.0% Asian, 0.3% American Indian, 1.4% from other races, and 1.7% from two or more races. Those of Hispanic or Latino origin made up 3.0% of the population. In terms of ancestry, 25.9% were German, 22.4% were Irish, 15.8% were English, 6.2% were Italian, and 6.1% were American.

Of the 18,016 households, 34.4% had children under the age of 18 living with them, 60.3% were married couples living together, 9.2% had a female householder with no husband present, 26.1% were non-families, and 20.6% of all households were made up of individuals. The average household size was 2.63 and the average family size was 3.04. The median age was 42.6 years.

The median income for a household in the county was $81,096 and the median income for a family was $89,188. Males had a median income of $57,218 versus $43,371 for females. The per capita income for the county was $35,964. About 3.8% of families and 5.5% of the population were below the poverty line, including 7.0% of those under age 18 and 6.1% of those age 65 or over.

Education

Public schools

Kent Island High School
Queen Anne's County High School
Centreville Middle School
Matapeake Middle School
Stevensville Middle School
Sudlersville Middle School
Bayside Elementary School
Centreville Elementary School
Church Hill Elementary School
Grasonville Elementary School
Kennard Elementary School
Kent Island Elementary School
Matapeake Elementary School
Sudlersville Elementary School
Gunston Day School
Wye River Upper School

Colleges and universities
Chesapeake College

Communities

Towns

Barclay
Centreville (county seat)
Church Hill
Millington (partly in Kent County)
Queen Anne (partly in Talbot County)
Queenstown
Sudlersville
Templeville (partly in Caroline County)

Census-designated places
The Census Bureau recognizes the following census-designated places in the county:

Chester
Grasonville
Kent Narrows
Kingstown
Stevensville

Unincorporated communities

Crumpton
Dominion
Ingleside
Love Point
Matapeake
Price
Romancoke
Ruthsburg

See also
National Register of Historic Places listings in Queen Anne's County, Maryland

References

External links

Queen Anne's County government
Kent Island & Queen Anne's County News

 
Maryland counties
1706 establishments in Maryland
Populated places established in 1706
Maryland counties on the Chesapeake Bay